Funen Series for men, also known as Albani Series for men for sponsorship reasons, and often shortened to FS serien and FS Herre, is the highest division for men organised by the regional football association DBU Fyn (DBUF) and one of the fifth-highest divisions overall in the Danish football league system. The league, deciding the Funen Football Championship, was first introduced with the 1904–05 season and throughout the years the competition format have gone through several series of changes. At the time of the league's introduction, it was placed at the top of the Danish football league system featuring the best regional amateur teams of Funen, but has since been moved to its current status as the fifth best level in Danish football, after a short period as the sixth best level, now featuring lower ranking amateur teams including the reserve squads of clubs playing at the Danish third league tier or above.

The division has changed its name on numerous occasions. It has previously been known as Førsteholdsrækken (1904/05–1913/14), A-rækken (1914/15–1925/26; or FBUs A-række, Række A) and Mesterskabsrækken (1926/27–1944/45; or FBUs Mesterrække to distinguish it from the other regional leagues; unofficially shortened to Mesterrækken), before settling with the current name of Fynsserien in 1945, eventually becoming Fynsserien for Herrer to distinguish it to the women's corresponding regional league, that was introduced in the 1970s. Ahead of the 2008/09-season, the Albani Brewery (since 2000 known as Royal Unibrew) obtained the naming rights for the highest men's and women's leagues under the auspices of DBU Funen, and both leagues have since respectively been known as Albaniserien for Herrer and Albaniserien for Kvinder.

History 

In the first couple of seasons, the Funen League Championship had to be won three times in a row, or four times in total, in order for a club to obtain the permanent ownership of the championship trophy, which otherwise would only be held by the reigning championship club for a year. The first trophy, made of silver and valued at 200 kr., was financed by the newly founded regional association (at this time named Fyens Bold Union), granted to Odense Boldklub in 1907 after winning the first three editions of the football championship. The second trophy, financed by the Danish FA, was reportedly also handed over to Odense BK after obtaining their fourth league title in 1916.

Between 1913 and 1931, the Funen championship clubs qualified for the provincial football championship, Provins-Fodboldturneringen, and until 1927 thereby the Danish national football championship, Landsfodboldturneringen. A-rækken was established by Funen FA in 1914 as a continuation of the Førsteholdsrækken. The league tournament under the auspices of the Funen Football Association changed its name from A-rækken to Mesterskabsrækken in 1926, beginning with the 1926/27-season, which also includes a new tournament schedule with several new laws.

In May/June 2008, starting with the upcoming 2008/09-season, Fyns Boldspil-Union (FBU) signed a marketing agreement with the local company Albani Brewery (who became Royal Unibrew in 2000), that involved promoting the highest amateur leagues for both men and women under the auspices of the regional football association – an agreement that have been continuously renewed in subsequent years. The agreement effectively changed the name of men's league to 'Albaniserien for Herrer' and also involved the winners of both the men's and women's leagues receiving cash prizes – the two winners of the 2010/11-season received DKK 10,000. At the same time, cooperations was established with the two regional newspapers, Fyns Amts Avis and Fyens Stiftstidende, to publish extended pre-season startup appendixes in addition to the normal newspaper layout, and with the regional television station TV 2/Fyn to bring weekly match highlights and interviews from a selected match, chosen by DBU Funen, in a given league round besides focusing on a specific theme, such as fair play, inspiration for managers, fan cultures and the referee's work and function, during the entire TV report and including local football celebrities. The initiative behind this project of promoting the league came to life by the chairman of Sanderum Boldklub, Jan Nanfeldt, and was made in the wake of a large dropout rate in the youth ranks and in the hopes of making it more attractive to play and watch association football in the lower ranking leagues. The weekly coverage project by the television station was discontinued before the beginning of the 2009 spring season.

Funen Series sponsor logo:

Funen Championship winners 
The winner in a given season wins the Funen Football Championship (with the official title of Fynsmestre) and is automatically promoted to the Denmark Series. The runner-up enters a home/away promotion playoff against teams from the highest leagues of the other regional associations for the right to enter the Denmark Series. Teams placing in the bottom are automatically relegated to either the Series 1, group 1 (featuring teams from the south of Funen) or Series 1, group 2 (featuring teams from the north of Funen). Depending on the number of teams, that are members of FBU Funen, relegated from Denmark Series, the number of teams relegated to Series 1 will be either increased or decreased.

Førsteholdsrækken (1904–1914)

A-rækken (1914–1926)

Mesterskabsrækken (1926–1945)

Fynsserien (1945–)

Footnotes

References 

Denmark
5
Sports leagues established in 1904
Funen Football Championship